André Bruno de Frévol de Lacoste (14 June 1775 in Pradelles – 2 February 1809 in Saragosse) was a French general of the First Empire. He was killed during the Siege of Saragossa.

Honours 
 Lacoste's name is engraved on the Arc de Triomphe, 38th column.

References

1809 deaths
1775 births
French generals
French commanders of the Napoleonic Wars
Names inscribed under the Arc de Triomphe